The National Film Award for Best Non-Feature Film on Family Welfare is one of the National Film Awards presented annually by the Directorate of Film Festivals, the organisation set up by Ministry of Information and Broadcasting, India. It is one of several awards presented for Non-Feature Films and awarded with 'Rajat Kamal' (Silver Lotus).

The award was instituted in 1982, at 30th National Film Awards and awarded annually for short films produced in the year across the country, in all Indian languages.

Awards 

Award includes 'Rajat Kamal' (Silver Lotus Award) and cash prize. Cash prize amount varied over the period. Following table illustrates the cash prize amount over the years:

Winners 
Following are the award winners over the years:

References

External links 
 Official Page for Directorate of Film Festivals, India
 National Film Awards Archives

Family Welfare Film
Documentary film awards